Little Harbour, Nova Scotia could mean the following places:

 Little Harbour, Halifax, Nova Scotia in the Halifax Regional Municipality
 Little Harbour, Shelburne, Nova Scotia in the Municipality of the District of Shelburne
 Little Harbour, Pictou, Nova Scotia in Pictou County
 Little Harbour, Richmond, Nova Scotia in Richmond County